This is a list of notable students, professors, and alumni of the Polytechnic University of the Philippines. The following people were distinguished in various fields such as public service, religion, literary arts, commerce, medicine, among others. The list includes people who have studied at various levels in PUP, from high school up to postgraduate school.

Prominent alumni

Science, technology, medicine, and mathematics

Business

Politics, law, and government

News

Literature

Film, theater, and television

Music

Art, architecture, and engineering

Religion

Athletics

Academics

College founders and presidents

Professors and scholars

Faculty 
Professors who are also PUP alumni are listed in italics.

Note 
1. People who attended PUP, but did not graduate or have yet to graduate.
2. An alumnus of PUP that also serves as faculty.

References

External links 
 Successful and famous PUP alumni – alumni blog site

Polytechnic University of the Philippines
Poly
Lists of Filipino people by school affiliation